Spencer Street Power Station was a Victorian era coal and (later) oil-fired power station which operated on Spencer Street in central Melbourne, Victoria, Australia. The station was opened in 1894, and supplied power to the city's residents, as well as being a wholesale supplier to other municipal distributors. It came under the management of the State Electricity Commission of Victoria in 1941. By the 1960s the capacity of the station reached 109 MW, but was used only for peak load. The station was closed in 1982 after becoming redundant. Eventually deemed an eyesore, demolition commenced in 2006 and was completed in 2008.

History
Spencer Street Power Station was built by the City of Melbourne to supply electricity to the city, initially to provide street lighting, opening in 1894. Arthur James Arnot designed and managed Spencer Street power station from 1894 to 1901 for the Melbourne City council.

A Station:-
The first power plant consisted of 24 General Electric direct current (DC) generators installed in four groups of six. Each group was belt driven by a 300HP Austral Otis horizontal compound slow speed steam engine. The terminal voltage was 3 kV DC and the electricity was used for street lights, trams, lifts and city buildings. Steam was supplied from four Babcock & Wilcox water tube boilers. In 1897 four General Electric 75 kW alternators were added. They were belt driven by the existing engines. Output was 2 kV and 72 Hz. In 1900 a Peach three-crank compound 2500HP steam engine was installed. It was coupled to a Johnson & Phillips 120 kW alternator. The alternating current (AC) was used in the surrounding suburbs via transformers. 1905 saw further expansion with one 200 kW alternator, 4x350 kW vertical Belliss steam engines that were direct-coupled to DC generators at 460 V DC. This was to augment the city supply. Steam was supplied by another four Babcock boilers.

In 1907 the first turbines were installed, with two 750 kW British Westinghouse Parsons 4.4 kV single-phase machines added. The old arc lighting plant was removed to provide the space. 1908 saw three Allen triple-expansion engines installed, each coupled to 750 kW generator and more boilers. A Siemens 4.4 MW 6.6 kV three-phase alternator was added in 1913. Next year, two William Robinson 5 MW turbo-alternators were added. 1917 saw the further addition of a 6.5 MW turbo-alternator from British Westinghouse. This was a three-phase, 6.6 kV 50 Hz machine, and ran at 1500 RPM. In 1927 four 6 MW three-phase 6.6 kV turbo-alternators were installed. At this time all the DC generators were replaced with motor-generators generators.

B+C Stations-
In 1949 two 15 MW Parsons turbo-generators were installed in an adjacent site. Steam was supplied by large oil-fired water tube boilers. Ten years later two 30MW Parsons machines were added and called C station. Steam was supplied by more water-tube boilers that were fitted with pulverized fuel equipment for burning coal, but for pollution reasons they were only oil fired.

In 1941 the station came under the management of the State Electricity Commission of Victoria and became part of the state electricity network. Progressive upgrades saw the capacity of the station rise to 109 MW by the 1960s, but newer power stations in the Latrobe Valley meant that the station was retained for peak use only.

Abandonment and demolition
After closure in 1982, the power station sat idle awaiting redevelopment. In 2003 a man was arrested for painting the slogan 'No jobs on a dead planet' on the chimney. A girl died in 2004 after falling down a seven-metre hole inside the power station.

In May 2006 the site was sold for $7.6 million to Russian developers Vladimir Stepanov, Dmitri Bril and Oleg Mogilnitskiy, with asbestos removal and demolition commencing soon after to allow the redevelopment of the site. The historic tower started being dismantled in September 2007 and the site was fully cleared by April 2008.

Gallery

Notes

Bibliography
 

Coal-fired power stations in Victoria (Australia)
Heritage sites in Melbourne
Demolished buildings and structures in Melbourne
Buildings and structures demolished in 2008
2008 disestablishments in Australia
1894 establishments in Australia
Buildings and structures completed in 1894
Melbourne City Centre